High Flying Bird is a 2019 American sports drama film directed by Steven Soderbergh, from a story suggested by André Holland, with the screenplay by Tarell Alvin McCraney. The film stars Holland, Zazie Beetz, Melvin Gregg, Sonja Sohn,  Zachary Quinto, Glenn Fleshler, Jeryl Prescott, Justin Hurtt-Dunkley, Caleb McLaughlin, Bobbi Bordley,  Kyle MacLachlan and Bill Duke, with additional appearances of basketball players Reggie Jackson, Karl-Anthony Towns and Donovan Mitchell. The film follows a sports agent who must pull off a plan in 72 hours, pitching a controversial opportunity to his client, a rookie basketball player during the company’s lockout. The film was shot entirely on the iPhone 8, becoming Soderbergh's second film to be shot on an iPhone, after Unsane.

The film had its world premiere at the Slamdance Film Festival on January 27, 2019, and was released on February 8, 2019, by Netflix. The film received positive reviews from critics, which praised its performances, Soderbergh's direction, themes, editing, shooting style and screenplay.

Plot

Ray Burke is an agent working for a New York sports agency that finds itself in the middle of a lockout. After his credit card is declined at an upscale restaurant, his boss David Starr tells him that the company is losing clients, the bank accounts and credit cards of the employees are frozen, and that he could be fired along with other employees. This forces Ray to look for a plan that could save the company from the lockout as well as give his client, Erick Scott, new opportunities. He recruits the help of his former assistant, Sam.

The next day, Ray visits newly drafted Jamero Umber's mother, Emera, with an offer. She refuses and reaffirms that she is the only agent and lawyer that her son will ever need. Ray's ex-wife, Myra, tells him that the company is in a lockout and will need to renegotiate new terms with agents and players. However, they will need to wait over a month to settle, as the team owners are at a standstill with the TV networks over millions of dollars. Ray asks her to cancel the deal, convinced that the players won’t be paid well during the lockout, which could last up to six months. Meanwhile, future teammates Erick Scott and Jamero Umber have an argument on Twitter, heavily publicized by media outlets.

Ray heads to Back Court Day, an annual event at a community center featuring a basketball camp for local kids and appearances by star athletes. While Erick is signing autographs and answering questions, Jamero arrives with his mother in tow. Erick and Jamero confront each other about their Twitter argument; tensions rise as they trade insults. They end up playing a one-on-one basketball game, which is recorded by the kids on their phones. A video is posted on social media and goes viral, garnering 24 million views. Ray gets the idea to stream games on streaming services and social media sites like Snapchat, YouTube, and Netflix, thus enabling the players to make money during the lockout. Erick is not convinced and feels he could put his place in the NBA at risk. Nevertheless, he accepts.

The next day Sam meets with Ray to discuss their careers going forward. Sam mentions to Ray that Erick might fire him, as he's looking to "move laterally" within the company. Erick fires Ray for lying to him about the fact that everything was for money. However, Ray’s plan succeeds and the players who signed with the company remained signed, meaning that Erick was never in danger and will be able to play in the league once the lockout is over. Ray reveals to Starr that the entire plan to take players to pay-per-view/streaming platforms was all a ruse to force the end of the lockout. It is implied that, through his actions, Ray has taken over Starr's position at the agency. Sam goes to work for the Players’ Association as she and Erick begin a relationship. Sam opens the package Ray gave Erick earlier, which he called a "Bible". The package contains Harry Edwards's book The Revolt of the Black Athlete. Sam begins to read it as Erick showers. Back at the agency, Ray is shown entering a meeting with Edwards. After Erick exits the shower and asks about the package, Sam replies:  "You need to read this."

Cast

Additionally, Skip Bayless, Shannon Sharpe, Joy Taylor, Evan Rosenblum, Van Lathan,  and Kristina Pink appear as themselves. Basketball players Reggie Jackson, Karl-Anthony Towns, and Donovan Mitchell make appearances as themselves in individual interview scenes.

Production
In October 2017, it was announced André Holland had been cast in the film, with Steven Soderbergh directing from a screenplay written by Tarell Alvin McCraney, with Extension 765 producing. In March 2018, Zazie Beetz and Kyle MacLachlan joined the cast of the film. In April 2018, Melvin Gregg joined the cast of the film.

Principal photography began in February 2018, in New York City and the film wrapped on March 15, 2018. The film was shot using an iPhone 8 smartphone, equipped with an anamorphic lens produced by Moondog Labs, while utilizing the FiLMic Pro video app.

Release
In September 2018, Netflix acquired distribution rights to the film. Speaking about how Netflix got involved with the film, director Steven Soderbergh explained: 

It had its world premiere at the Slamdance Film Festival on January 27, 2019. It was released on February 8, 2019.

Reception
The website's critics consensus reads: "High Flying Bird takes a thoughtful and engrossing look at professional sports that sees Steven Soderbergh continuing to test the limits of new filmmaking technology." On Metacritic, the film has a weighted average score of 78 out of 100, based on 23 critics, indicating "generally favorable reviews".

References

External links
  on Netflix
 

2019 films
2010s business films
2010s sports drama films
American business films
American sports drama films
American basketball films
Films about labor relations
Films directed by Steven Soderbergh
Films set in New York City
Films shot in New York City
Mobile phone films
English-language Netflix original films
2019 drama films
2010s English-language films
2010s American films
2019 independent films
Films about National Basketball Association